Kholodnaya is a rural locality (a settlement) in Severo-Baykalsky District, Republic of Buryatia, Russia. The population was 345 as of 2010.

Geography 
Kholodnaya is located 77 km east of Nizhneangarsk (the district's administrative centre) by road.

References 

Rural localities in Severo-Baykalsky District